W.A.K.O. held its first amateur world championships in 1978 in West Berlin, after having previously staged two European championships the two years previously.  It followed this with a second world championships a year later in Tampa, Florida.  During the 1980s the world championships were held every other year except for in 1985 when a feud within the W.A.K.O. organization led to two versions of the championships being held on the same date – one in London, the other in Budapest.

In the 1990s W.A.K.O. held its world championships intermittently with at least one every other year although, in 1993 the organization again had a temporary political dispute which like 1985 meant two championships in one year.  Additionally, the outbreak of the Balkan War resulted in the 1995 world championships being moved to Kyiv and in 1997 to Gdańsk.  By the turn-of-the-twentieth-century, the organization began introducing two different world championships every two years - one typically covering forms of kickboxing such as full-contact, semi-contact and musical forms, while the other types such as Thai-boxing, low-kick kickboxing and later K-1 rules.  Of late, W.A.K.O. have begun to get involved with the SportAccord World Combat Games, hosting male and female full-contact, semi-contact and low-contact kickboxing competitions at the 2010 event, with the 2009 world championships (both events) being used as qualifiers.

List of World Championships

WAKO World Championships (Seniors and Masters)
W.A.K.O. Amateur Kickboxing World Championships

 https://web.archive.org/web/20160809232051/http://www.wakoweb.com/en/page/official-wako-results/feeb0c9a-67d8-4081-9bda-45384f8ee985

WAKO World Championships (Cadets and Juniors)
 Cadets first time add to championship from 2004 (5th)

 https://web.archive.org/web/20160809232051/http://www.wakoweb.com/en/page/official-wako-results/feeb0c9a-67d8-4081-9bda-45384f8ee985
 http://www.wakoweb.com/en/article/2006-a-year-to-remember/028576ff-9873-4616-aa62-c62dc0119c2c
 http://www.wakoweb.com/en/news/world-cadetjunior-championships-naples-italy/be366fd5-5038-4974-b7be-3917f46db431
 http://www.wakoweb.com/en/event/wako-world-cadets-and-juniors-championships/e13a080a-0caa-44e8-b9ca-b33b6b4100e3
 http://www.wakoweb.com/en/event/cadets-and-juniors-world-championships/d9885de8-f925-4186-931c-5f80eec9f1a0
 2016 Results : https://www.sportdata.org/kickboxing/set-online/veranstaltung_info_main.php?active_menu=calendar&vernr=227

WAKO World University Championships (Students)

 http://www.wakoweb.com/en/event/1st-wako-international-university-kickboxing-championship/01574997-1b7b-471c-8e0e-62e11d2765dc

All time medal table

See also
List of WAKO Amateur European Championships
List of kickboxers

References

External links
 WAKO World Association of Kickboxing Organizations Official Site

WAKO Amateur World Championships events
Kickboxing-related lists